Glaucostola metaxantha is a moth of the family Erebidae first described by William Schaus in 1905. It is found in Costa Rica.

References

Phaegopterina
Moths described in 1905